John Beard (c. 1716 – 5 February 1791) was an English tenor of the 18th century. He is best remembered for creating an extensive number of roles in the operas and oratorios of George Frideric Handel.

Beard's début came in Handel's 1734 revival of his Il pastor fido, which was a great success. Beard continued to sing for Handel, creating roles in ten of his operas and performing in every one of Handel's English-language oratorios, odes, and music dramas, with the sole exception of The Choice of Hercules. He also performed for Thomas Arne, and sang at the Chapel Royal. His marriage, during 1739, to Lady Henrietta Herbert, only daughter of James Waldegrave, 1st Earl Waldegrave caused much scandal: Lord Egmont commented that "there is no prudence below the girdle". Lady Henrietta died in 1753.  In 1759 Beard married again, this time to Charlotte Rich, whose father John Rich was the proprietor of the opera house in Covent Garden. After John Rich died in 1761, Beard succeeded to the proprietorship until 1767, when deafness forced him to retire.  He sold his interest in Covent Garden for £60,000.  He died at Hampton.

Handel created several heroic leading roles for Beard, a revolution in the heyday of the castrato voice. The title roles in Samson, Judas Maccabeus, and Jephtha call for strength and expressive qualities over agility. He also sang the role of Farmer Hawthorne in the world premiere of Thomas Arne's Love in a Village. Charles Burney commented that he "constantly possessed the favour of the public by his superior conduct, knowledge of Music, and intelligence as an actor." Burney's article in Rees's Cyclopædia noted that Beard, "an energetic English singer, and an excellent actor, was brought up in the king's chapel. He knew as much of music as was necessary to sing a single part at sight, and with a voice that was more powerful than sweet, he became the most useful and favourite singer of his time, on the stage, at Ranelagh, at all concerts; and in Handel's oratorios he had always a capital part, being by his knowledge of music the most steady support of the choruses, not only of Handel, but in the odes of Greene and Boyce".

References

Bibliography

HANDEL & JOHN BEARD (Paper given to the 2005 Handel Symposium)

1710s births
Year of birth uncertain
1791 deaths
18th-century British male opera singers
English operatic tenors